Sociological Methodology is a biannual peer-reviewed academic journal that covers research methods in the field of sociology. The editors-in-chief are David Melamed and Mike Vuolo (The Ohio State University). It was established in 1969 and is currently published by SAGE Publications on behalf of the American Sociological Association.

Abstracting and indexing 
Sociological Methodology is abstracted and indexed in:

According to the Journal Citation Reports, its 2021 impact factor is 6.118, ranking it 7th out of 148 journals in the category "Sociology".

References

External links 
  (issues since 1997)
 Sociological Methodology on JSTOR (all issues, since 1969)

American Sociological Association academic journals
Annual journals
English-language journals
Publications established in 1969
SAGE Publishing academic journals
Sociology journals